USS Bab (SP-116) was high-speed motorboat leased for one dollar by the U.S. Navy during World War I. She was placed in service as a patrol craft and was assigned to the vicinity of Chicago, Illinois. Post-war she was returned to her owner for the sum of one dollar.

Built in South Boston 

Bab was a 38-foot section motorboat of the high-speed "sea sled" design built in 1917 at Boston, Massachusetts, by Murray and Tregurtha Company.  She was leased by the Navy for $1.00 from Milton Wilson of Chicago, Illinois; and designated as a section patrol craft, SP-116; and delivered on 6 October 1917.

World War I service 

Assigned to the 9th Naval District, Bab patrolled the waters of Lake Michigan until the onset of winter caused her to be laid up.

Post-war disposition 

Eventually judged "not suitable for naval use", Bab was returned to her owner for the sum of $1.00 on 31 December 1918.

References 

 
 USS Bab (SP-116), 1917-1918

World War I patrol vessels of the United States
Ships built in Boston
Motorboats of the United States Navy
Great Lakes ships
1916 ships